The iPhone 8 and iPhone 8 Plus are smartphones designed, developed, and marketed by Apple Inc. They are the eleventh generation of the iPhone. The iPhone 8 was released on September 22, 2017, succeeding the iPhone 7 and iPhone 7 Plus respectively and preceding the iPhone XR. The iPhone 8 and iPhone 8 Plus were discontinued by Apple on April 15, 2020 with the release of the second-generation iPhone SE.

Except for the addition of a glass back, the designs of the iPhone 8 and 8 Plus are largely similar to that of their predecessors. Notable changes include the removal of the rose gold and jet black color variants, addition of inductive charging, a faster processor, and improved cameras and displays. The iPhone 8 and 8 Plus share most of their internal hardware with the iPhone X.

The iPhone 8 and 8 Plus were discontinued as of February 2020, having sold 86.3 million units worldwide, making them one of the best-selling smartphones of all time.

The iPhone 8 and 8 Plus were the final models of the flagship iPhone model to feature the Home Button and Touch ID. The entry-level iPhone SE second and third generations share the iPhone 8's exterior dimensions.

History 
Apple invited the press to a media event at the Steve Jobs Theater in the Apple Park campus on September 12, 2017. The iPhone 8 and iPhone 8 Plus were announced at that event, and released on September 22, 2017.

On April 9, 2018, Apple introduced an iPhone 8 with a red color finish and a black front, in support of their partnership with Product Red and their AIDS fundraising campaign.

In March 2020, Apple started selling refurbished iPhone 8 Plus models starting at $469. The price was subsequently lowered to US$359  In May 2020, Apple started selling iPhone 8 models starting at $339. The price was also subsequently lowered to US$319 

On April 15, 2020, Apple announced the second-generation iPhone SE and discontinued the iPhone 8 and 8 Plus, which share the external form factor but has upgraded internals including an A13 Bionic processor. On March 8, 2022, Apple announced the third-generation iPhone SE with the same exterior dimensions, but with an upgraded camera and Apple's A15 processor.

Specifications

Hardware

Display 
The iPhone 8 and 8 Plus retain the Retina HD Display found in the iPhone 7, but they now feature True Tone technology, allowing for automatic screen adjustments based on surrounding ambient lighting. They can play HDR10 and Dolby Vision content despite not having an HDR-ready display, done by down-converting the HDR content to fit the display while still having some enhancements to dynamic range, contrast, and wide color gamut compared to standard content.

Camera 
The iPhone 8 features a 12 MP camera with autofocus, f/1.8 aperture and optical image stabilization capable of capturing 4K video at 24, 30, or 60 frames per second, or 1080p video at 30, 60, 120 or 240 frames per second.

The iPhone 8 Plus upgrades the main camera for a wide-angle lens with up to 10× digital zoom or 2× optical zoom, and retains a second, telephoto lens similar to the one found on the iPhone 7 Plus, but with improved depth-of-field and lighting effects in Portrait mode.

Both models have a 7 MP front camera with an f/2.2 aperture capable of capturing 1080p video at 30 frames per second and 720p video at 24 frames per second, along with face detection and high-dynamic range.

The iPhone 8 and 8 Plus record videos with single channel audio (mono).

Still photos with 6.5 megapixels (3412×1920) can be captured during video recording.

Chipset 
The iPhone 8 and 8 Plus contain the Apple A11 Bionic system-on-chip, a hexa-core processor that the company says features two performance cores that are 25% faster than those found in the iPhone 7's A10 processor and four efficiency cores that are 70% faster than those in the prior model. The phones also feature an Apple-designed graphics processing unit 30% faster than prior units, with the same level of performance as the A10 at half the power.

Other 

The phones have glass backs instead of the complete aluminum housing found on prior models, enabling the use of Qi inductive charging. The phones are rated IP67 for water resistance and dust resistance.
 Both models come with 64 and 256 gigabyte storage options, and are offered in silver, gold, or Space Gray color options. A Product Red special edition version in red with a black front was released on April 9, 2018. The iPhone 7 and 7 Plus special editions had a white front, The iPhone 8 and 8 Plus was the last iPhone with white front in Silver and White Color.

In addition to Qi wireless charging, the iPhone 8 also supports wired charging using Apple's proprietary Lightning connector.  It can fast-charge from a charger providing USB Power Delivery combined with a special USB-C to Lightning adapter cable supporting fast charging.

The iPhone 8 has a 6 out of 10 reparability score from iFixit, mainly due to the use of excessive glue for the back glass.

Software 

Both the iPhone 8 and 8 Plus were supplied with iOS 11 on launch, and support iOS 12, iOS 13, iOS 14, iOS 15 and iOS 16.

Reception 
Reception of the phones was generally positive, with reviewers praising the addition of inductive charging, fast charge capability, and the new Apple A11 processor, while criticizing the aging design that was introduced with the iPhone 6 and iPhone 6 Plus in 2014.

Samuel Axon of Ars Technica called the A11 processor "a marvelous feat of engineering", writing that it offers "industry-leading performance". Axon also praised the cameras, writing that "The colors are great, and low light performance is very good for a smartphone". Chris Velazco of Engadget praised the speed of the A11 processor, the build quality and the "excellent" camera, while criticizing design familiarities with previous iPhone generations and limited water-protection levels compared to competitors.

John McCann of TechRadar enjoyed the feel of the glass back despite criticizing the phone's overall design. McCann also praised the camera and called inductive charging a "useful" addition to the iPhone lineup.

David Pierce of Wired similarly stated that the iPhone 8 models were overshadowed by the iPhone X, despite calling them "virtually perfect phones". Pierce praised performance, cameras, and displays, while repeatedly criticizing the "outdated" design.

Nilay Patel of The Verge called the iPhone 8 the "default option", noting that the 8 models stand as almost universally overlooked by Apple's other new iPhone launched, the iPhone X. He nevertheless praised the device's form factor for being easy and non-slippery to hold and the display's addition of True Tone technology and upgraded speakers, though he cited issues with inductive charging speed through wireless pads as well as the price of the iPhone 8 Plus 256 GB, which was close to that of the iPhone X. Patel also criticized the iPhone 8's aging design, dating back to the iPhone 6 released in 2014; the most notable critique was of the thick bezels when compared to other 2017 smartphones, designed with nearly bezel-less faces to incorporate larger screens in a similar form factor.

The iPhone 8 and 8 Plus were also criticized for their durability, as drop tests performed showed that the rear glass is not "the most durable glass ever in a smartphone", as claimed by Apple.

Camera testing company DxOMark gave the camera on the iPhone 8 a rating of 92 and 8 Plus a rating of 94, giving them the title of best smartphone cameras tested by the company. The Samsung Galaxy Note 8 later matched the iPhone 8 Plus with an identical overall score of 94. They were later overtaken by the Google Pixel 2, which scored a 98 rating.

Although being the first mobile phone to record 2160p at 60 frames per second, the iPhone 8, 8 Plus and X have been criticized in a review by GSMArena for its mono (single-channel) audio recording for videos, while stereo audio recording for videos has been available on competing mobile phone models for several years, such as the Samsung Galaxy S3 and Sony Xperia S from 2012.

Issues 
On August 31, 2018, Apple announced that a "very small percentage" of iPhone 8 devices released between September 2017 and March 2018 contained a manufacturing defect in the logic board. This fault affected iPhone 8 models sold in Australia, China, Hong Kong, India, Japan, Macau, New Zealand, and the United States. Defective devices may experience unexpected reboots, a frozen or unresponsive screen, or may fail to turn on. Users with an affected device, as determined by their serial number, can have their device replaced for free by Apple. This issue does not affect the iPhone 8 Plus.

See also 
 Comparison of smartphones
 History of iPhone
 List of iOS devices
 List of best-selling mobile phones
 Timeline of iPhone models

Notes

References

External links 

  – official site

IOS
Mobile phones introduced in 2017
Computer-related introductions in 2017
 
Mobile phones with 4K video recording
Mobile phones with pressure-sensitive touch screen
Discontinued flagship smartphones